NorthStar Moving Company is a woman-owned moving and storage company founded in 1994 and is based in Los Angeles, California. The company provides moving services for businesses and individuals (both domestic and international), along with full-service storage.

NorthStar Moving's entire fleet of trucks run on bio-diesel, their boxes are made of 100% recyclable materials, and they use biodegradable eco bubble. Additionally, the company incorporates green features in their facilities such as skylights and extra windows in its warehouses and offices to eliminate unnecessary electrical use. They also use recycled wooden vaults for their storage compartments.

In 2016, NorthStar Moving launched franchising opportunities. In 2022, NorthStar Moving won its trademark infringement lawsuit against King David Van Lines and its operators. A federal judge awarded NorthStar Moving $13 million against Ohad Guzi personally after finding that Mr. Guzi willfully infringed NorthStar Moving's trademark by deceiving consumers into believing they were hiring NorthStar Moving.

The company has been named one of the Best Medium-Sized Companies to Work for in LA by the Los Angeles Business Journal for ten consecutive years.

References

External links
http://www.northstarmoving.com

Moving companies of the United States
Transport companies established in 1994
Companies based in Los Angeles
Privately held companies based in California
Privately held companies of the United States